Bana Jabri is a French gastroenterologist and immunologist of Syrian and Armenian descent. She is the Sarah and Harold Lincoln Thompson Professor in the Department of Medicine at the University of Chicago. She researches inflammatory diseases of the intestine, including celiac disease. She is an elected fellow of the Association of American Physicians.

Early life and education
Bana Jabri was born in Syria; her father was Syrian and her mother was Armenian. She moved to Germany when she was two years old and to France when she was twelve.
She attended Paris Diderot University, graduating in 1986 with a bachelor's degree in biochemistry. She graduated from the Pasteur Institute in 1991 with her Doctor of Medicine, followed by a residency at Assistance Publique – Hôpitaux de Paris, which is when she had her first child. She then completed a fellowship at the US National Institutes of Health. She returned to Paris Diderot University for a PhD in immunology, graduating in 1996.

Career
In 1994, she accepted a position as an assistant professor in the department of pediatric gastroenterology at Necker–Enfants Malades Hospital, remaining through 1998. In 1999 she worked at Princeton University as a staff researcher, becoming a research scientist the following year. She accepted a position at the University of Chicago in 2002 as an assistant professor; she was promoted in 2005 to associate professor and in 2011 to full professor. In 2006 she became the co-director of its Digestive Disease Research Core Center and in 2011 she was made the director of research for its Celiac Disease Center. In 2018 she received a named professorship, becoming the Sara and Harold Lincoln Thompson Professor.

Awards and honors
In 2009, she became the first researcher in the US to win the William K. Warren, Jr. Prize for Excellence in Celiac Disease Research. In 2017 she received the Lloyd Mayer Prize in Mucosal Immunology. She is also an elected member of the Association of American Physicians and a recipient of the Llewellyn John and Harriet Manchester Quantrell Award for Excellence in Undergraduate Education.

References

Living people
Syrian immunologists
Syrian women physicians
Gastroenterologists
Immunologists
Syrian people of Armenian descent
Paris Diderot University alumni
Pasteur Institute
University of Chicago faculty
Year of birth missing (living people)